David or Dave Mullins may refer to:

 David Wiley Mullins (1906–1987), American academic
 David W. Mullins Jr. (1946-2018), American economist, former Federal Reserve Vice Chairman
 David Mullins (jockey) (born 1996), National Hunt jockey
 Dave Mullins (freediver), New Zealand freediver
 Dave Mullins (animator), American animator